North Africa, or Northern Africa, is a region encompassing the northern portion of the African continent. There is no singularly accepted scope for the region, and it is sometimes defined as stretching from the Atlantic shores of Mauritania in the west, to Egypt's Suez Canal in the east.

The United Nations's definition for the region's boundaries includes Morocco, Algeria, Tunisia, Libya, Egypt, Sudan, and Western Sahara, the territory disputed between Morocco and the self-proclaimed Sahrawi Republic. The African Union defines the region similarly, only differing from the UN in excluding Sudan. The Sahel, south of the Sahara Desert, can be considered as the southern boundary of North Africa. North Africa includes the Spanish cities of Ceuta and Melilla, and the plazas de soberanía. It can also be considered to include Malta, as well as other Spanish, Portuguese and Italian regions such as the Canary Islands, Madeira, Lampedusa and Lampione.

Northwest Africa has been inhabited by Berbers since the beginning of recorded history, while the eastern part of North Africa has been home to the Egyptians. In the seventh and eighth centuries, Arabs from the Middle East swept across the region during the Early Muslim conquests. These peoples formed a single population in many areas, as Berbers and Egyptians merged into Arabic and Muslim culture. These processes of Arabization and Islamization has defined the cultural landscape of North Africa ever since. 

The countries of North Africa share a large amount of their ethnic, cultural and linguistic identity with the Middle East. The Islamic influence in North Africa is significant, with the region being major part of the Muslim world. North Africa is associated with West Asia in the realm of geopolitics to form the Middle East-North Africa region.

Geography
North Africa has three main geographic features: the Sahara desert in the south, the Atlas Mountains in the west, and the Nile River and delta in the east. The Atlas Mountains extend across much of northern Algeria, Morocco and Tunisia. These mountains are part of the fold mountain system that also runs through much of Southern Europe. They recede to the south and east, becoming a steppe landscape before meeting the Sahara desert, which covers more than 75 percent of the region. The tallest peaks are in the High Atlas range in south-central Morocco, which has many snow-capped peaks.

South of the Atlas Mountains is the dry and barren expanse of the Sahara desert, the largest sand desert in the world. In places the desert is cut by irregular watercourses called wadis—streams that flow only after rainfall but are usually dry. The Sahara's major landforms include ergs, large seas of sand that sometimes form into huge dunes; the hammada, a level rocky plateau without soil or sand; and the reg, a desert pavement. The Sahara covers the southern part of Algeria, Morocco and Tunisia, and most of Libya. Only two regions of Libya are outside the desert: Tripolitania in the northwest and Cyrenaica in the northeast. Most of Egypt is also desert, with the exception of the Nile River and the irrigated land along its banks. The Nile Valley forms a narrow fertile thread that runs along the length of the country.

Sheltered valleys in the Atlas Mountains, the Nile Valley and Delta, and the Mediterranean coast are the main sources of fertile farming land. A wide variety of valuable crops including cereals, rice and cotton, and woods such as cedar and cork, are grown. Typical Mediterranean crops, such as olives, figs, dates and citrus fruits, also thrive in these areas. The Nile Valley is particularly fertile and most of Egypt lives close to the river. Elsewhere, irrigation is essential to improve crop yields on the desert margins.

People

The inhabitants of North Africa are roughly divided in a manner corresponding to the principal geographic regions of North Africa: the Maghreb, the Nile valley, and the Sahel. The Maghreb or western North Africa on the whole is believed to have been inhabited by Berbers since at least 10,000 B.C., while the eastern part of North Africa or the Nile Valley has mainly been home to the Egyptians and Nubians. Ancient Egyptians record extensive contact in their Western desert with people that appear to have been Berber or proto-Berber. As the Tassili n'Ajjer and other rock art findings in the Sahara have shown, the Sahara also hosted various populations before its rapid desertification in 3500 B.C and even today continues to host small populations of nomadic trans-Saharan peoples. The archaeological evidence from the Holocene period has shown that Nilo-Saharan speaking groups had populated the central and southern Sahara before the influx of Berber and Arabic speakers, around 1500 years ago, who now largely populate the Sahara in the modern era.

The migration of the Banu Hilal and the Banu Sulaym westward into the Maghreb in the eleventh century introduced Arabic culture and language to the countryside. Historians mark their movement as a critical moment in the Arabization of North Africa.

The official languages in the countries making up the Maghreb are Arabic, Tamazight as a second official language in Algeria and Morocco, and Spanish in Ceuta and Melilla. French is also used as an administrative language in Algeria, Morocco and Tunisia. The most spoken language is Maghrebi Arabic, which is a form of ancient Arabic dating back from the 8th century AD that follows a Berber grammatical and syntactical structure. For the remaining North African countries, the official language is Arabic. The largest ethnic groups in North Africa are Arabs, Berbers are considered the second largest ethnicity in north Africa in the west and the Arabs are a majority also in the east approaching the Middle East. The region is predominantly Muslim with a Jewish minority in Morocco, Algeria and Tunisia, and significant Christian minority—the Copts—in Egypt, Algeria, Morocco and Tunisia.

The inhabitants of the Spanish Canary Islands are of mixed Spanish and North African Berber ancestry, and the people of Malta are of primarily Southern Italian/Sicilian, as well as, to a lesser extent, North African and Middle Eastern ancestry and speak a derivative of Arabic. However, these areas are not generally considered part of North Africa, but rather Southern Europe, due to their proximity to mainland Europe and their European-based cultures and religion.

Culture

The people of the Maghreb and the Sahara regions speak Berber languages and several varieties of Arabic and almost exclusively follow Islam. The Arabic and Berber languages are distantly related, both being members of the Afroasiatic language family. The Tuareg Berber languages are notably more conservative than those of the coastal cities.

Over the years, Berbers have been influenced by contact with other cultures: Egyptians, Greeks, Punic people, Romans, Vandals, Arabs, Europeans and Africans. The cultures of the Maghreb and the Sahara therefore combine indigenous Berber, Arab and elements from neighboring parts of Africa and beyond. In the Sahara, the distinction between sedentary oasis inhabitants and nomadic Bedouins and Tuaregs is particularly marked. 

The diverse peoples of North Africa are usually categorized along ethno-linguistic lines. In the Maghreb, where Arab and Berber identities are often integrated, these lines can be blurred. Some Berber-speaking North Africans may identify as "Arab" depending on the social and political circumstances, although substantial numbers of Berbers (or Imazighen) have retained a distinct cultural identity which in the 20th century has been expressed as a clear ethnic identification with Berber history and language. Arabic-speaking Northwest Africans, regardless of ethnic background, often identify with Arab history and culture and may share a common vision with other Arabs. This, however, may or may not exclude pride in and identification with Berber and/or other parts of their heritage. Berber political and cultural activists for their part, often referred to as Berberists, may view all Northwest Africans as principally Berber, whether they are primarily Berber- or Arabic-speaking.

Egyptians over the centuries have shifted their language from Egyptian (in its late form, varieties of Coptic) to modern Egyptian Arabic while retaining a sense of national identity that has historically set them apart from other people in the region. Most Egyptians are Sunni Muslim, although there is a significant minority of Coptic Christians.

The Maghreb formerly had a significant Jewish population, almost all of whom emigrated to France or Israel when the North African nations gained independence. Prior to the modern establishment of Israel, there were about 500,000 Jews in Northern Africa, including both Sephardi Jews (refugees from Spain, France and Portugal from the Renaissance era) as well as indigenous Mizrahi Jews. Today, less than fifteen thousand remain in the region, almost all in Morocco and Tunisia, and are mostly part of a French-speaking urban elite. (See Jewish exodus from Arab and Muslim countries.)

History

Prehistory

Due to the recent African origin of modern humans, the history of Prehistoric North Africa is important to the understanding of pre-hominid and early modern human history in Africa.
Some researchers have postulated that North Africa rather than East Africa served as the exit point for the modern humans who first trekked out of the continent in the Out of Africa migration. The earliest inhabitants of central North Africa have left behind significant remains: early remnants of hominid occupation in North Africa, for example, were found in Ain el Hanech, near Saïda (c. 200,000 BCE); in fact, more recent investigations have found signs of Oldowan technology there, and indicate a date of up to 1.8 million BCE.
Recent finds in Jebel Irhoud in Morocco have been found to contain some of the oldest Homo sapiens remains; This suggests that, rather than arising only in East Africa around 200,000 years ago, early Homo sapiens may already have been present across the length of Africa 100,000 years earlier. According to study author Jean-Jacques Hublin, "The idea is that early Homo sapiens dispersed around the continent and elements of human modernity appeared in different places, and so different parts of Africa contributed to the emergence of what we call modern humans today." Early humans may have comprised a large, interbreeding population dispersed across Africa whose spread was facilitated by a wetter climate that created a "green Sahara", around 330,000 to 300,000 years ago. The rise of modern humans may thus have taken place on a continental scale rather than being confined to a particular corner of Africa. 
In September 2019, scientists reported the computerized determination, based on 260 CT scans, of a virtual skull shape of the last common human ancestor to modern humans/H. sapiens, representative of the earliest modern humans, and suggested that modern humans arose between 260,000 and 350,000 years ago through a merging of populations in East and Southern Africa.
 
The cave paintings found at Tassili n'Ajjer, north of Tamanrasset, Algeria, and at other locations depict vibrant and vivid scenes of everyday life in central North Africa during the Neolithic Subpluvial period (about 8000 to 4000 BCE). Some parts of North Africa began to participate in the Neolithic revolution in the 6th millennium BCE, just before the rapid desertification of the Sahara around 3500 B.C. largely due to a tilt in the Earth's orbit. It was during this period that domesticated plants and animals were introduced in the region, spreading from the north and east to the southwest. There has been an inferred connection between areas of rapid drying and the introduction of livestock in which the natural (orbital) aridification was amplified by the spread of shrubs and open land due to grazing. Nevertheless, changes in northern Africa's ecology after 3500 BCE provided the backdrop for the formation of dynastic civilizations and the construction of monumental architecture such as the Pyramids of Giza.

Archaeological evidence has attested that population settlements occurred in Nubia as early as the Late Pleistocene era and from the 5th millennium BC onwards, whereas there is "no or scanty evidence" of human presence in the Egyptian Nile Valley during these periods, which may be due to problems in site preservation.Several scholars have argued that the African origins of the Egyptian civilisation derived from pastoral communities which emerged in both the Egyptian and Sudanese regions of the Nile Valley in the fifth millennium BCE.

When Egypt entered the Bronze Age, the Maghreb remained focused on small-scale subsistence in small, highly mobile groups. Some Phoenician and Greek colonies were established along the Mediterranean coast during the 7th century BCE.

Antiquity and ancient Rome

The most notable nations of antiquity in western North Africa are Carthage, Numidia and Mauretania. The Phoenicians colonized much of North Africa including Carthage and parts of present-day Morocco (including Chellah, Essaouira and Volubilis). The Carthaginians were of Phoenician origin, with the Roman myth of their origin being that Dido, a Phoenician princess, was granted land by a local ruler based on how much land she could cover with a piece of cowhide. She ingeniously devised a method to extend the cowhide to a high proportion, thus gaining a large territory. She was also rejected by the Trojan prince Aeneas according to Virgil, thus creating a historical enmity between Carthage and Rome, as Aeneas would eventually lay the foundations for Rome. Ancient Carthage was a commercial power and had a strong navy, but relied on mercenaries for land soldiers. The Carthaginians developed an empire in the Iberian Peninsula, Malta, Sardinia, Corsica and northwest Sicily, the latter being the cause of First Punic War with the Romans.

Over a hundred years and more, all Carthaginian territory was eventually conquered by the Romans, resulting in the Carthaginian North African territories becoming the Roman province of Africa in 146 B.C. This led to tension and eventually conflict between Numidia and Rome. The Numidian wars are notable for launching the careers of both Gaius Marius, and Sulla, and stretching the constitutional burden of the Roman republic as Marius required a professional army, something previously contrary to Roman values, to overcome the talented military leader Jugurtha. Kingdom of Mauretania remained independent until being annexed to the Roman Empire by Emperor Claudius in 42 AD.

North Africa remained a part of the Roman Empire, which produced many notable citizens such as Augustine of Hippo, until incompetent leadership from Roman commanders in the early fifth century allowed the Germanic peoples, the Vandals, to cross the Strait of Gibraltar, whereupon they overcame the fickle Roman defense. The loss of North Africa is considered a pinnacle point in the fall of the Western Roman Empire as Africa had previously been an important grain province that maintained Roman prosperity despite the barbarian incursions, and the wealth required to create new armies. The issue of regaining North Africa became paramount to the Western Empire, but was frustrated by Vandal victories. The focus of Roman energy had to be on the emerging threat of the Huns. In 468 AD, the Romans made one last serious attempt to invade North Africa but were repelled. This perhaps marks the point of terminal decline for the Western Roman Empire. The last Roman emperor was deposed in 476 by the Heruli general Odoacer. Trade routes between Europe and North Africa remained intact until the coming of Islam. Some Berbers were members of the Early African Church (but evolved their own Donatist doctrine), some were Berber Jews, and some adhered to traditional Berber religion. African pope Victor I served during the reign of Roman emperor Septimius Severus. Furthermore, during the rule of the Romans, Byzantines, Vandals, Ottomans and Carthaginians the Kabyle people were the only or one of the few in North Africa who remained independent. The Kabyle people were incredibly resistible so much so that even during the Arab conquest of North Africa they still had control and possession over their mountains.

Arab conquest to modern times

The early Muslim conquests included North Africa by 640. By 700, most of North Africa had come under Muslim rule. Indigenous Berbers subsequently started to form their own polities in response in places such as Fez and Sijilmasa. In the eleventh century, a reformist movement made up of members that called themselves the Almoravid dynasty expanded south into Sub-Saharan Africa.

North Africa's populous and flourishing civilization collapsed after exhausting its resources in internal fighting and suffering devastation from the invasion of the Banu Sulaym and Banu Hilal. Ibn Khaldun noted that the lands ravaged by Banu Hilal invaders had become completely arid desert.

After the Middle Ages much of the area was loosely under the control of the Ottoman Empire. The Spanish Empire conquered several coastal cities between the 16th and 18th centuries. After the 19th century, the imperial and colonial presence of France, the United Kingdom, Spain and Italy left the entirety of the region under one form of European occupation.

In World War II from 1940 to 1943 the area was the setting for the North African Campaign. During the 1950s and 1960s all of the North African states gained independence. There remains a dispute over Western Sahara between Morocco and the Algerian-backed Polisario Front.

The wider protest movement known as the Arab Spring began with revolutions in Tunisia and Egypt which ultimately led to the overthrow of their governments, as well as civil war in Libya. Large protests also occurred in Algeria and Morocco to a lesser extent. Many hundreds died in the uprisings.

Country statistics

Architecture

Further information in the sections of Architecture of Africa:
 Prehistoric North African Architecture
 Ancient North African Architecture
 Medieval North African Architecture

Science and technology

Further information in the sections of History of science and technology in Africa:

 Education
 Astronomy
 Mathematics
 Metallurgy
 Medicine
 Agriculture
 Textiles
 Maritime technology
 Architecture
 Communication systems
 Warfare
 Commerce
 By country

See also
 

 Demographics of the Middle East and North Africa
Culture of Egypt
 European Digital Archive on Soil Maps of the World
 List of modern conflicts in North Africa

References

Further reading
 Cesari, Jocelyne. The awakening of Muslim democracy: Religion, modernity, and the state (Cambridge University Press, 2014).
 Fischbach, ed. Michael R. Biographical encyclopedia of the modern Middle East and North Africa (Gale Group, 2008).
 Ilahiane, Hsain. Historical dictionary of the Berbers (Imazighen) (Rowman & Littlefield, 2017).
 Issawi, Charles. An economic history of the Middle East and North Africa (Routledge, 2013).
 Naylor, Phillip C. North Africa, Revised Edition: A History from Antiquity to the Present (University of Texas Press, 2015).

External links

 Human Rights for Indigenous Peoples
 North Africa's Weather Forecasts and Weather Conditions
 North Africa news and analysis
 Africa Interactive Map from the United States Army Africa

North Africa
Geography of North Africa
Regions of Africa